Phall, also spelt fall, faal, phaal, phal or fal, is a curry which originated in the Bangladeshi-owned curry-houses of Birmingham, England and has also spread to the United States. It is not to be confused with the char-grilled, gravyless, finger food phall from Bangalore.

It is one of the hottest forms of curry regularly available, even hotter than the vindaloo, using many ground standard chilli peppers, or a hotter type of chilli such as scotch bonnet, habanero, or Carolina Reaper. Typically, the dish is a tomato-based thick curry and includes ginger and optionally fennel seeds.

Phall has achieved notoriety as the spiciest generally available dish from Indian restaurants. It is, however, quite rare to find in comparison to vindaloo (which is usually the staple hottest curry of most Indian restaurants in the UK). In 2008 in the UK, a charity competition in Hampshire was based on competitors eating increasingly hot phalls. A Season 1 episode of Man v. Food in New York City featured host Adam Richman accepting a challenge involving eating a full serving of phall at Brick Lane Curry House in Manhattan.

References

English cuisine
Indian cuisine in the United Kingdom
Bangladeshi cuisine in the United Kingdom
Sylheti cuisine